Aurat Pair Ki Juti Nahin Hai is a 1985 Indian drama film. The film was directed by B.K. Adarsh and stars Marc Zuber, Gulshan Grover, Sachin, and Deepti Naval in the lead. The film focused on the plight of a wife trapped in a submissive marriage. It featured a prominent ghazal by Pankaj Udhas, "Tum Na Mano Magar Haqeeqat Hai Yehi".

Plot

The story is about the relationship of Rakesh and Shobha. Rakesh believes in certain principles & adheres to it sternly. Rakesh's inflexible & uncompromising principles and beliefs cause a lot of upheaval in his married life.

Cast
 Sachin
Deepti Naval
Marc Zuber
Gulshan Grover
Jagdeep

References

External links

1985 films
1980s Hindi-language films
Indian drama films